The Copernicus Center (formerly Gateway Theatre) is a 1,890-seat former movie palace that is now part of the Copernicus Center in the Jefferson Park community area of Chicago in Cook County, Illinois, United States. The Copernicus Center is located at 5216 W. Lawrence Avenue.

The former Gateway Theater was designed by architect Mason Rapp of the prestigious firm of Rapp and Rapp, famous for their design of deluxe theaters not only in Chicago (Chicago, Oriental, and Palace Theatres) but throughout the United States. It is the architect's only surviving atmospheric theatre in Chicago.

History
June 27, 1930, was the opening day for Jefferson Park's new deluxe motion picture palace. Weeklong festivities in the area leading up to the opening were capped off by a gargantuan parade sponsored by area businesses. All the Chicago dailies covered the event, and in fact, the Chicago Herald-Examiner put forth a full-page spread proclaiming the new theater as "the most acoustically perfect theatre in the world." The reports were not guilty of sensationalism, as the architects indeed had given extra special attention to the acoustics, as talking pictures, a relative newcomer to the entertainment field had found a perfect environment in this new, different theater.

The original Grand Hall and Grand Foyer ceilings and walls were designed and hand painted in a maze of connected Greek/Roman scenes of Deities and custom patterns by noted Chicago artist Louis Grell (1887-1960).

Because of the new sound films (nicknamed "talkies"), plans to include a stage for vaudeville and stage shows were abandoned. Instead, a small "sound stage" was built to the back of the proscenium opening to house the screen and "newfangled" speakers. If the "talkies" were just a fad, the sound stage could easily be replaced with a full stage house with the usual complement of dressing rooms, proper rooms, fly space for the scenery and the like. The talking pictures soon became the norm, and, in 1932, all motion picture studios stopped making silent pictures, thus sounding the death knell for vaudeville and stage shows.

For over 50 years, the Gateway was the direct-from-the-Loop flagship theater for the prolific Balaban and Katz movie theater chain. For decades, images of such Hollywood stars as Astaire and Rogers, Hepburn and Tracy, Bogart and Bacall, Greta Garbo, Bette Davis, Judy Garland, James Stewart, Cary Grant, John Wayne, and hundreds of others graced the screen of the Gateway. The theatre had perhaps its wildest days in 1973 when 45,000 patrons packed the old place weekly for an extended run of The Exorcist.

In 1977, the search began for a permanent site to house a Polish Cultural Center in Chicago. In 1979, groundbreaking ceremonies took place at the old Gateway Theater Building located near Milwaukee and Lawrence avenues. Because the Gateway Theater historically was the first movie theater in Chicago built exclusively for the "talkies," the Foundation decided to preserve the theater itself while remodeling around it, dividing the original 40-foot entry lobby and constructing three floors of office, meeting room and classroom space for the Cultural Center. This first stage was completed in 1981.

In 1985, the "Solidarity Tower," with its matching facade, was erected atop the building. The exterior of the building was modified to resemble the historic Royal Castle in Warsaw, Poland and seen by commuters driving along the Kennedy Expressway. The money was raised through the generosity of individuals and corporations that recognized the significance to the community of this symbol of the struggle for freedom in an oppressed country.  That year the Copernicus Foundation took over the administration of the Gateway theatre and opened its doors to the Polish American and other ethnic communities, as well as Jefferson Park civic organizations which it has been serving until the present day.

In 1988, the Lake Shore Symphony Orchestra became the official orchestra-in-residence. The orchestra practices weekly and hosts concerts three times a year.

The present
Since then, the theater has been cleaned, a thrust stage has been built, and the theater has been used for a wide variety of programs, not only for the Polish community, but also those of other ethnic groups which do not have their own facilities, e.g. East Indian, Spanish, Korean, Philippine, etc., as well as the American community.

Musical concerts, plays, athletic competitions, seminars, dance recitals, children's plays, choir competitions, and Candidates' Nights are just some of the many programs presented in the theater.

As knowledge of the existence of the theater grew, so did its usage and programs. The Copernicus Center theater is now in use an average of 48 weeks per year, with the heaviest usage during the weekends. The programs have become more sophisticated in nature and serve many more people. The theater seats 1,890.

Access
The Copernicus Center is located one block west of the Lawrence Avenue exit of the Kennedy Expressway. It is accessible via the Blue Line's Jefferson Park station as well as  the  Jefferson Park stop on the Metra Union Pacific/Northwest commuter rail line.

See also
 Balaban and Katz
 Theatre in Chicago
 History of Chicago
 Culture of Chicago
 Poles in Chicago
 Polonia
 Polish-Americans

References

External links
 Jefferson Park Historical Society's article on the Gateway Theatre
 Description of the Gateway Theatre
  Picture of the 'old' Gateway Exterior
 View of the Present Gateway Theatre's Exterior and its historic Wurlitzer Organ
 Balaban and Katz Foundation
 Balaban and Katz 
 Louis Grell Foundation

Theatres completed in 1930
Cinemas and movie theaters in Chicago
Concert halls in Illinois
Landmarks in Chicago
Music venues in Chicago
Theatres in Chicago
Polish-American culture in Chicago
Atmospheric theatres
Arts centers in Illinois